The Ann Arbor Sun was a biweekly underground newspaper founded by John Sinclair in April 1967. The newspaper was originally called the Warren-Forest Sun (the name refers to the neighborhood in Detroit between Warren Avenue and Forest Avenue) before it was changed to the Ann Arbor Sun in 1968 when Trans-Love Energies moved to Ann Arbor. The organization, founded by John Sinclair, his wife Leni Sinclair and artist Gary Grimshaw in 1967, set up shop in two big communal houses at 1510 and 1520 Hill St, where the Ann Arbor Sun was produced and edited by the members of the group. Early issues of the paper were printed with the silk screen and mimeograph equipment of the Artists Workshop Press, which Sinclair brought with him from Detroit to Ann Arbor.

On July 28, 1969, the Ann Arbor Sun printed a revised copy of the White Panther's ten-point program. The newspaper was considered to be the mouthpiece for the White Panther Party for quite some time before the newspaper transitioned to an independent publication spreading views on local issues, left-wing politics, music, and arts. Finally in 1976, the publication of the Ann Arbor Sun was suspended indefinitely.

See also
 List of underground newspapers of the 1960s counterculture

References

External links
Ann Arbor Sun at Ann Arbor District Library
Ann Arbor Sun at Independent Voices
Ann Arbor Sun at JSTOR

Defunct newspapers published in Michigan
Newspapers established in 1967
Publications disestablished in 1976
1967 establishments in Michigan
1976 disestablishments in Michigan
Mass media in Ann Arbor, Michigan